The JoJo Tour 2022 was the sixth headlining concert tour by American recording artist JoJo. Originally announced as the Good To Know Tour in February 2020, with initial dates being announced in Europe and North America, while the tour was scheduled to commence in April of the same year. Due to the increasing health and safety concerns, caused by the COVID-19 pandemic, the North American leg of the tour was rescheduled twice, with dates from November 2020 and May 2021 respectively. On January 15, 2021, the tour was cancelled altogether, due to the un-predictability of the pandemic. On October 26, 2021, JoJo announced the JoJo Tour 2022, which would serve in support of JoJo's fourth studio album Good to Know (2020) and her third EP Trying Not to Think About It (2021). The North American leg of the tour begun on February 24, 2022, in Portland, Oregon, United States and concluded on May 30, 2022, in Ottawa, Ontario.

Background
On February 21, 2020, JoJo announced her planned sixth headlining and third major world tour in support of her fourth studio album entitled the Good to Know Tour. The tour was originally scheduled to travel throughout North America and Europe with the first leg of the tour largely takes place in North America and initially beginning on April 21 at the Showbox in Seattle. The tour will travel to theaters across the country stopping in Portland, San Francisco, Los Angeles, San Diego, Atlanta, Chicago, Houston and more wrapping up in Minneapolis, MN on May 30.

On March 27, 2020, just under a month before the tour was set to launch, due to increasing health and safety concerns caused by the COVID-19 pandemic, the North American leg of the tour was rescheduled with all the cities remaining and the new dates now running throughout November and December. In the announcement JoJo stated "It breaks my heart to have to postpone this tour... I was so excited to get on the road and play the new music for you guys, but everyone’s safety and health of course comes first, and we have no choice but to do the right thing and reschedule for later this year. Until then we’ll dance and sing together virtually!". The tour was set to kick off with the original European dates throughout the UK beginning in Dublin, Ireland on Aug. 31, stopping off in Manchester, Birmingham and London amongst others before concluding on Sep. 25 in Stockholm, Sweden.

On January 15, 2021, the tour eventually had been cancelled altogether due to the un-reliability of the pandemic. In a statement JoJo said "While there is new hope and positivity surrounding the COVID vaccine, there is still immense uncertainty about touring this year. With that being said, and after careful consideration, I have decided to cancel the good to know tour (both U.S. and U.K./Europe)... At this point there is no other choice and I am BEYOND sorry to anyone this might inconvenience". She did mention that she would be working on new music too "One thing I can promise though: I will be working diligently on trying to plan a new tour (and new album?) for 2022. Stay safe. Love each other. Don’t give up hope. I love you madly."

Following the 'Trying Not to Think About It Tour" in October 2021, JoJo officially announced the rescheduled set of dates On October 26, 2021, titled simply as the "JoJo Tour 2022". In the announcement JoJo said "Performing live is one of my favorite parts of being an artist,” says JoJo. “It felt so right being back onstage for those dates in October, and I can’t wait to do it on a bigger scale in more cities next year!". The tour will now be in support of JoJo's fourth studio album Good to Know (2020) and her third EP Trying Not to Think About It (2021) with The first leg of the 45-date trek kicked off on February 24, 2022, in Portland, Oregon, United States, making stops in Seattle, San Francisco, Los Angeles, Nashville, Detroit, and Chicago, before concluding in Ottawa, Ontario on April 16, 2022. The second leg of the tour commenced on May 3 in London, England, heading to Scotland, Germany, Italy, and Denmark, before wrapping on May 30 in Stockholm, Sweden.

On February 1, 2022, JoJo announced that Quin, Tanerelle and Lindsey Lomis would be the list of acts that would lead as supports for the North American leg of the tour.

Set list

This set list is representative of the March 1, 2022, performance in San Francisco. It does not represent all concerts for the duration of the tour.

"What U Need”
”Man”
”Spiral SZN”
”Like That”
”Gold”
”Mad Love.”
”Love On The Brain” (Rihanna" cover)
”High Heels”
“Worst (I Assume)”
“Dissolve”
“Marvins Room”
“Boy Without A Heart”
“Anxiety (Burlinda’s Theme)”
“Demonstrate”
“Weak” (SWV" cover)
“Say So”
”Feel Alright”
“Comeback”
“Pedialyte”
“Think About You”
“Music”
“Leave (Get Out)”
“Too Little Too Late”
“Like This”
“Baby It's You”

Tour dates

Cancelled shows

References

External links
 Official Website

2022 concert tours
Concert tours postponed due to the COVID-19 pandemic